Thomas of Monmouth (fl. 1149–1172) was a Benedictine monk who lived in the Priory at Norwich Cathedral,  England during the mid-twelfth century. He was the author of The Life and Miracles of St William of Norwich, a hagiography of William of Norwich that is considered an antisemitic text.

Career
Thomas was presumably born in Monmouth, since he is identified by the town's name. Historian Gavin I. Langmuir says that he appears to have been "respectably educated". He arrived in Norwich in 1149–50, a few years after the 1144 death of William of Norwich, a child whose unsolved death was blamed on the local Jewish community. Thomas quickly devoted himself to the promotion of William's claims to sainthood, by collecting evidence of his holiness and by arguing that he had been martyred by the Jews in a ritual murder.

Thomas of Monmouth unsuccessfully tried to get William of Norwich canonized as a saint, but did succeed in creating a cult around him in Norwich. He contended that he had received visions from the founding Bishop of Norwich, Herbert de Losinga, who had died in 1119. Losinga told him that William's body should be moved into the chapter house of the priory. Thomas had to battle the sceptical prior Elias, who was unconvinced of William's sanctity. But the body was moved in 1150, the year in which Elias died, and by then the cult of William was established.

Life of William

Thomas heard from a converted Jew named Theobald of Cambridge that every year there is an international council of Jews at which they choose the country in which a child will be killed during Easter. This is because a Jewish prophecy says that the killing of a Christian child each year will ensure that the Jews will be restored to the Holy Land. Monmouth claimed that in 1144 England was chosen, and the leaders of the Jewish community delegated the Jews of Norwich to perform the killing. They then abducted and crucified William.

This is the earliest recorded ritual murder accusation against the Jews. According to Langmuir, the evidence strongly suggests that Thomas had discovered that the Jews had crucified William in a manner designed to mimic the death of Jesus. In his own account, this specific claim is never made by any of the earlier accusers, who only say that Jews were responsible for William's death. Even Theobald only speaks of sacrifice. Thomas of Monmouth's account helped inflame antisemitic sentiment in England, resulting in the eventual expulsion of the Jews from England in 1290.

Folklorist Gillian Bennett says of the book that "The tone throughout is intemperate, and the gloating description of William's martyrdom quite sick.  In Thomas's eyes, there is nothing that Jews will not stoop to, and they are constantly referred to as 'our enemies'."

Thomas continued to add material to his book after the first volume came out in 1150. The second volume, probably written up in 1155, is even more "strident" in tone, according to Bennett, suggesting that Thomas' claims had met with considerable scepticism and opposition. He marshals evidence to support his assertions. It is only in this volume that the claims about an annual crucifixion ritual are made. Later volumes concentrate on accumulating evidence of miraculous cures effected by William. A final volume was completed in 1172 and a preface was added.

Nothing else is known about his life after this date.

The single surviving manuscript of Thomas' work was discovered by M. R. James and published in 1896 with historical essays by James and Augustus Jessopp.

Works

References

External links
 Medieval Sourcebook on Thomas of Monmouth

12th-century Latin writers
English conspiracy theorists
Welsh Benedictines
Year of birth unknown
Year of death unknown
Blood libel
12th-century English writers